The Canadian province of Quebec held municipal elections in 465 communities on November 2, 2003. Some results from these elections are included on this page.

Bécancour

Bedford

Source: "Eastern Townships Municipal Elections Results," Sherbrooke Record, 3 November 2003, p. 7.

References

Municipal elections in Quebec
Quebec municipal elections
Quebec municipal elections